John Brown (October 19, 1849 – October 17, 1924) was a general agent and politician in Ontario, Canada. He represented Perth North in the Legislative Assembly of Ontario from 1898 to 1902 and from 1903 to 1904 as a Liberal.

He was born in Downie township, Perth County, Canada West. Brown was mayor of Stratford from 1890 to 1891. He married Isabella Gunn.

Brown was first elected to the Ontario assembly in 1898. He was defeated by John C. Monteith in 1902 but that election was declared invalid and Brown was elected in a 1903 by-election.

References

External links
 

1849 births
1924 deaths
Mayors of Stratford, Ontario
Ontario Liberal Party MPPs
People from Perth County, Ontario